Typhoon Dot, known in the Philippines as Typhoon Saling, was the strongest storm of the 1985 season. Dot originated from a small area of thunderstorm activity in early to mid October. The system was first classified on October 11, and steadily intensified over the next few days. Dot attained typhoon strength on October 15, and subsequently entered a period of explosive deepening, which was not anticipated by forecasters. The next day the intensification rate slowed, but that evening, Dot attained its maximum intensify. A steady weakening trend began on October 17, though the system maintained typhoon intensity through the passage of the Philippines. After entering the South China Sea late on October 18, Dot briefly re-intensified, only to weaken as it approached Vietnam. On October 21, Dot struck Vietnam while still a typhoon, but dissipated the next day over the high terrain of the nation.

Although damage across the Philippines was less than initially expected, the typhoon lashed the nation with heavy rains. Province of Nueva Ecija suffered the worst effects from Dot. There,  of crops and 90% of all buildings were damaged. In Cabanatuan, 2,500 homes and 90% of structures were destroyed. Overall, 42 towns were flooded, forcing a total of 125,000 people to flee their homes, 35,000 of which were homeless. Furthermore, 52,933 houses were leveled while an additional 200,450 were damaged. Nationwide, 24 were hurt. While tracking through the South China Sea, Dot passed through Hainan Island. There, two casualties occurred while 34 others suffered injuries. Across the island, over 2,300 dwellings were destroyed. In all, Dot was responsible for 90 deaths and $104.9 million (1985 USD) in damage.

Meteorological history

Following the extratropical transition of Typhoon Brenda on October 5, a mid-level subtropical ridge became centered over the northwestern Pacific, which resulted in an absence of the typical southwesterly monsoon flow typically seen during the autumn. At 1200 UTC, the Japan Meteorological Agency (JMA) first identified the system. The next day, the storm's outflow became better defined as the storm tracked west-northwest. On October 13, wind shear began to decrease, and the cyclone developed a well-defined circulation. Based on this, the Joint Typhoon Warning Center (JTWC) upgraded the system into Tropical Storm Dot. That evening, the JMA followed suit. The newly upgraded Dot was situated in an area of strong easterly winds, and thus the JTWC correctly predicted to the system to continue west-northwest, despite forecasts from various tropical cyclone forecast models that showed otherwise. Dot steadily strengthened during this period, and midday on October 14, the JMA classified Dot as a severe tropical storm. Several hours later, the JTWC upgraded Dot into a typhoon, with the JMA following early on October 15. Around this time, the Philippine Atmospheric, Geophysical and Astronomical Services Administration (PAGASA) also monitored the storm and assigned it with the local name Saling.

Shortly after attaining typhoon intensity, Dot entered a period of explosive intensification. However, this was not expected by forecasters at the JTWC nor the forecast models due to the presence of dry air. By this time, Dot had developed a well-defined eye surrounded by very cold cloud tops. However, the JTWC also noted that both the storm's radius of maximum winds and central dense overcast were unusually small.

By October 16, Dot's rate of deepening had leveled off. After maintaining this intensity until the morning of October 17, Dot started a gradual weakening trend while passing directly over Samar Island and encountering increased wind shear. Around this time, radar imagery showed that Dot displayed a small pinhole eye  in diameter. On the afternoon of October 18, the typhoon made landfall along southern Luzon. That evening, Dot re-emerged into the South China Sea while still at typhoon intensity. Continuing west-northwest, Dot quickly became better organized. Also around this time, the typhoon exited PAGASA's warning zone. After brushing Hainan Island, Dot resumed weakening. Land interaction with the high terrain of the nation resulted in rapid weakening, and by 0000 UTC October 22, the JTWC ceased tracking Dot. The JMA followed suit 12 hours later.

Preparations, impact and aftermath

Due to the impending threat of Dot, storm signals were raised along the north and central Philippines. The metropolis of Manila was placed on typhoon alert, forcing the mobilization of emergency crews. Seven domestic and two military flights were called off. Additionally, railway and shipping services were cancelled. All United States military installations in the Philippines were placed in a Tropical Cyclone Condition of Readiness and two airbases, Clark Air Base and Cubi Point NAS, were evacuated. Schools and many offices were shut down in preparation of Dot.

Typhoon Dot was the strongest tropical cyclone to directly strike the Bicol Region of the Philippines since Typhoon Irma in 1981. Although the storm brought heavy rains to much of Philippines, damage was less than initially expected due to the storm's small size. In Davao Del Sur, 10 people were killed and several homes were destroyed due to mudslides. A man was swept away in a landslide in Legaspi, which also forced the evacuation of 165 families. The worst effects of the storm were felt in Nueva. There,  of crops and 90% of all buildings were damaged, totaling to $5.3 million (1985 USD). Offshore, three people were killed and 16 others were rendered missing when a cargo ship sunk. Seven fatalities occurred in Cabanatuan, where 2,500 homes were demolished and 22,000 were damaged. Ninety percent of all infrastructure was destroyed. Flooding in low-lying areas of Manila forced the evacuation of 29,000. Elsewhere, 69,000 houses were flooded in Pampanga, Tarlac, and Nueva Ecija. In all, 42 towns were flooded, which forced a total of 125,000 people to flee their homes, 35,000 of which were homeless. Overall, 52,933 homes were destroyed while an additional 200,450 were damaged. Throughout the Philippines, 24 people were hurt, and 88 perished, and over 1 million people were directly affected. Nationwide, damage totaled $104.9 million. This included $92.8 million in property damage and less than $1 million in agriculture.

During the aftermath of the storm, the governor of Nueva Ecija requested President Ferdinand Marcos to declare the province a disaster area. Additionally, UNICEF was asked to provide water-purifying tablets. The Philippine Red Cross, Philippine government, local authorities and civic organizations provided relief assistance in the immediate aftermath of the storm. Despite private appeals for up to $1.4 million for reconstruction aid, the Philippine government did not submit a request for international aid. However, by October 25, eight non-government relief agencies provided relief, which totaled $1.15 million. Furthermore, the government of Switzerland provided $8,061 worth of aid.

After passing the Philippines, Typhoon Dot skirted Hainan Island, leaving two dead. Communications were lost in Sanya, the southernmost city in the island. Thirty-four were hurt. A total of 50,000 homes and 83,000 acres of farmland were flooded. More than 2,300 houses also collapsed. Along the China mainland, heavy rains were recorded, although damage was minor.

See also

 Other tropical cyclones named Dot
 Typhoon Haiyan
 Typhoon Utor
 Typhoon Nancy (1982)
 Typhoon Goni (2020)
 Typhoon Vamco (2020) - a typhoon with a similar track as Dot's.
 Typhoon Noru - a tropical cyclone that has a similar track as Dot's.

Notes

References

1985 Pacific typhoon season
Typhoons in the Philippines
Typhoons in Vietnam
Typhoon Dot
Typhoon Dot
Typhoons
1985 in the Philippines
Dot